The Arga class of tugboats are a series of six service watercraft being built by Tebma Shipyard Limited (a subsidiary of Bharati Shipyard Ltd) in Malpe, for the Indian Navy.

Description
Each tug has a capacity of 10 tonnes bollard pull at 85 per cent maximum continuous rating (MCR), speed of 12 knots at 85 per cent MCR and is fitted with two  Caterpillar Kirloskar engines, coupled to two steerable rudder propellers of  diameter. The vessels have two auxiliary electrical generation plant of 60 kW each and are fitted with a sewage treatment plant. They have been designed by M/s Ska Marine, Chennai. INS Arga and INS Bali are named after the coastal villages of Karwar District and both were inducted into the service by Rear Admiral Atul Kumar Jain.

Ships in the class

See also
 Tugboats of the Indian Navy

References

External links
 Arga Commissioned at Karwar
 Bali and Anup launched
 Bali commissioned at Karwar
 Specifications
 Tebma official website

Ships of the Indian Navy
Tugs of the Indian Navy
Auxiliary tugboat classes